Tardavka (Tarźaw) is a rural locality (a selo) in Tardavsky Selsoviet, Belokataysky District, Bashkortostan, Russia. The population was 89 as of 2010. There are 2 streets.

Geography 
Tardavka is located 34 km southwest of Novobelokatay (the district's administrative centre) by road. Levali is the nearest rural locality.

References 

Rural localities in Belokataysky District